The PFL 8 mixed martial arts event for the 2021 season of the Professional Fighters League was held on August 19, 2021. This was the second event for of the playoffs with the Heavyweight and Women's Lightweight divisions competing. This event aired on ESPN, with the prelims on ESPN+.

Background
Kayla Harrison, the only two-time Olympic gold medalist in judo in the history of the United States, entered her second PFL playoffs unbeaten in 10 pro bouts. She faced Genah Fabian who held a 4-1 record and had won both of her PFL regular season bouts against Julija Pajic and Laura Sanchez to advance to the playoffs. This is the second time that Harrison and Fabian had been scheduled to fight in the PFL. They were set to meet in the 2019 semifinals in October of that year, but Fabian withdrew due to an illness after issues with her weight cut.

The other lightweight semifinal was expected to feature 2019 finalist Larissa Pacheco and former Invicta FC fighter Taylor Guardado. However, at the weigh-ins, Larissa Pacheco missed weight by 2 pounds and therefore was removed from the tournament and was replaced by 5th seeded Mariana Morais. Morais's original opponent, Claudia Zamora, instead faced Marina Mokhnatkina after Kaitlin Young, Marina's opponent, was removed from the card.

The heavyweight playoffs also began. Top seed Bruno Cappelozza took on Jamelle Jones, who qualified for the playoffs with a knockout of Klidson Abreu after stepping in as an alternate. Denis Goltsov and Ante Delija also met in the other heavyweight semifinal.

Results

2021 PFL Heavyweight playoffs

2021 PFL Women's Lightweight playoffs

See also 
List of PFL events
List of current PFL fighters

References

Professional Fighters League
2021 in mixed martial arts
August 2021 sports events in the United States
Events in Hollywood, Florida